Balkania may refer to:
Balkania (trade name), a trade name of a Greek industrial and trading company based in Athens
Balkania (proposed state), a proposed new state in the Balkans